MOONBOOTICA is the pseudonym of Hamburg DJs KoweSix (Oliver Kowalski) and Tobitob (Tobias Schmidt), who have been playing together since the 1990s.

General

The MOONBOOTICA music project was born at the early Moonbootica party series in the clubs of Hamburg. Their style can be categorized as electronic music, drawing on electro and house genres, with certain hip-hop influences. The pair founded the Moonbootique label, releasing their own productions on the imprint.

 The eponymous debut album Moonbootica was released in 2005. It included the single June which was very well received in the electronic music scene.
 The 2007 album Moonlight Welfare featured Der Mond - a collaboration with Hamburg compatriate Jan Delay. In 2011 Moonbootica released the track Tonight on the influential UK label Cheap Thrills.
 A third studio album was released in 2012. Our Disco Is Louder Than Yours was issued by Berlin label Four Music. Amongst the guests to feature here were Reggie Noble and Bon Homme from the Danish band WhoMadeWho.
 Shine, album number four, followed in June 2014, entering the top 50 of the German charts. Two singles from the album - These Days Are Gone and Beats & Lines - were presented in a split video shot in Los Angeles and directed by Skinny. This is the second time that Moonbootica have worked together with the director duo hailing from France. Their previous collaborative effort, ICONIC, was shown at the Cannes Film Festival.

Career

Moonbootica have worked on remixes for a variety of artists including Robbie Williams, Skunk Anansie, Beatsteaks, Faithless, Jan Delay, Hurts and Kruder & Dorfmeister. Their own releases have also featured illustrious guests such as Anthony Mills, Thomas Hofding, Thomas Azier, Mohini Geisweiler, Siri Svegler and US rap legend Reggie Noble. As well as playing DJ sets in clubs all over Europe on a regular basis (e.g. Watergate, Berlin / Razzmatazz, Barcelona / Krysha Mira, Moscow) and events in Australia and South America.

Moonbootica began playing an hour-long live show in 2013 which they have performed at renowned festivals like Rock am Ring/Rock im Park, Sputnik Springbreak and SonneMondSterne. For the live show, they created their very own lighting installation, weighing in at 1.5 tonnes. Guest vocalists and their own vocal performances extend the artistic spectrum far beyond the classic DJ show into a fully fledged live act. Since 2009 KoweSix has also worked with Kris Menace on the Black Van project, released by the New York label DFA.
Afterword
 
Capturing the excitement of Moonbootica in all their glory, the Moonbootica mix album And Then We Started To Dance has become a firm favourite amongst Moonbootica's followers, due in no small part to the brilliant spoken word introductions by the mysterious Peter Band!

In popular culture 
"I'm On Vacation" was featured in Fox animated series Duncanville episode "Judge Annie".

Discography

Singles 
Moonbootation (06/2001)
Get it on (04/2002)
Mau Mau high (01/2003)
We 1,2 Rock / Roll the Dice (01/2004)
Bulldog beats (07/2004)
June / Mustang (02/2005)
Listen (08/2005)
Pretty little angel (12/2005)
Mopedgang (04/2006)
Wattbird / Break of light (10/2006)
Jump Around (09/2007)
Der Mond feat. Jan Delay (10/2007)
Strobelight (05/2009)
The Ease (11/2009)
Men Of The Future (02/2010)
Tonight (01/2011)
I'm On Vacation Bitch feat. Redman (05/2012)
Iconic (03/2012)
Bounce With Me feat. Anthony Mills (11/2013)
My Hot Dope / Partylife (02/2014)
These Days Are Gone (05/2014)
Beats & Lines (05/2014)

Albums
 Moonbootica (10/2005)
 Moonlight Welfare (10/2007)
 Our Disco Is Louder Than Yours (05/2012)
 Shine (06/2014)
 Future (04/2018)

Mix compilations
 DJ sounds good (03/2004)
 ... and then we started to dance (10/2006)
 Moonbootique Records Present Sound (2007)
 Save The Night (10/2009)

Miscellaneous
 Dynamit Moonbootica RMX (2008) (Remix of Dynamite Deluxe's single 'Dynamit')

References

External links
 Moonbootica's website
 Moonbootique's website
 
 Moonbootica bei laut.de
 Moonbootica bei Facebook
 Moonbootique bei Facebook
 Moonbootica bei SoundCloud

German electronic music groups
German DJs
Electronic dance music DJs